"Give Me More, More, More (Of Your Kisses)" is a song written by Walter Price, Lefty Frizzell, and Jim Beck, sung by Frizzell, and released on the Columbia label (catalog no. 20885). In December 1952, it peaked at No. 1 on Billboards country and western jockey and juke box charts. It spent 21 weeks on the charts and was also ranked No. 6 on Billboards 1952 year-end country and western juke box chart and No. 10 on the year-end best seller chart.

See also
 Billboard Top Country & Western Records of 1952

References

Songs written by Lefty Frizzell
Lefty Frizzell songs
1952 songs